Schluersburg is an unincorporated hamlet in St. Charles County, in the U.S. state of Missouri.

History
A post office was established at Schluersburg in 1862, and remained in operation until 1908. According to tradition, the community took its name from a town of the same name in Germany.

References

Unincorporated communities in St. Charles County, Missouri
Unincorporated communities in Missouri